This is the discography of English post-punk band the Teardrop Explodes.

Albums

Studio albums

Compilation albums

Video albums

Singles

Notes

References

Discographies of British artists
Rock music group discographies
New wave discographies